Wallis Huberta Annenberg (born July 15, 1939) is an American philanthropist and heiress. Annenberg serves as president and chairwoman of the Board of The Annenberg Foundation, a multibillion-dollar philanthropic organization in the United States.

Early life and education
Wallis Annenberg was born in 1939 in Philadelphia, into a Jewish family, the daughter of publishing magnate Walter Hubert Annenberg, and his first wife, Bernice Veronica Dunkelman (known as Ronny), a socialite from Toronto, Canada. Her grandfather Moses Annenberg (1877–1942), owner of The Philadelphia Inquirer, emigrated from Germany to Chicago in 1900. Her father owned a  estate called Inwood, where Wallis was raised. When she was ten years old, her parents divorced and her mother moved to Washington, D.C., to marry Ben Ourisman, a Chevrolet car dealer. Meanwhile, her father remarried in the year after the divorce to Leonore "Lee" Cohn, the niece of Columbia Pictures President Harry Cohn.

She graduated from Pine Manor College in 1959 when it was a junior college.

She had a brother, Roger, who committed suicide at a psychiatric institution in Bucks County, Pennsylvania at age 22 in 1962 while on leave from Harvard University for treatment of schizophrenia. She named one of her sons after her brother.

Marriage and divorce
On a trip to Venice, in 1959, to celebrate completion of junior college, Annenberg met Seth Weingarten, who had just completed his undergraduate education at Princeton University and was looking forward to Yale Medical School. They quickly fell in love and, after only one year of studies at Columbia, Annenberg dropped out of school and married Weingarten at Inwood in 1960. They moved around the country, following her husband's career, and having four children in the process: Lauren (born in New Haven, Connecticut in 1961), Roger (who was named after Wallis's deceased brother), Gregory (born in New York City during Weingarten's residency at New York Hospital), and Charles (born in Roswell, New Mexico where Weingarten was serving as a medical officer at Walker Air Force Base). At her insistence, Weingarten accepted a position at UCLA (at the hospital now known as Ronald Reagan UCLA Medical Center) and they established a permanent home in California.

In 1975, she divorced Weingarten and in 1978 he won the custody of the children. One year later he offered Wallis full custody.

Career 
Then Wallis started to work for Triangle Publications, which included TV Guide and Seventeen magazine, as well as radio and TV stations nationwide. At this time her father was its chairman of the board. She stayed for three years after its sale to Rupert Murdoch in 1988.

She appeared on The Joan Rivers Show on the new Fox television network in 1986, alongside actresses Lucille Ball and Michele Lee.

Philanthropy
After she died in March 2009, Leonore Annenberg left the leadership of the Annenberg Foundation to Wallis and three of her children: Lauren, Gregory and Charles. Wallis Annenberg today carries on her father's legacy as a public benefactor. As chairman and president of the Annenberg Foundation, she donates the family name and fortune to philanthropic and charitable projects, largely to the benefit of Los Angeles County. She is on the board of trustees at the Los Angeles County Museum of Art as well as at the Museum of Contemporary Art, Los Angeles. She is also a supporter of the Harlem Children's Zone, the Ojai Foundation's "Council project" for inner-city kids, and the Ocean Alliance. She serves on the board of trustees at the University of Southern California (home of the USC Annenberg School for Communication and Journalism); the Wallis Annenberg Hall at USC was opened at part of the Annenberg School in 2014. In 2017 she was honored with the USC University Medallion for her philanthropy and leadership.

She is involved with the Wallis Annenberg Concourse at the Ronald Reagan UCLA Medical Center as well as the Wallis Annenberg Center for the Performing Arts, which held its opening gala in October 2013.

She was inspired by and provided funding to build the Universally-Accessible Treehouse in Torrance, California. "It is thrilling to be able to make it possible for people of all ages and physical abilities to experience the world from a treehouse," said Wallis Annenberg. "There's a sense of vision, fun and pure escape that only such a structure can provide."

Annenberg serves on the board of directors for the New York-based chapter of the foundation of Princess Charlene of Monaco.

Her children Lauren Bon, Gregory Weingarten and Charles Weingarten serve on the board of directors of the Annenberg Foundation. Her son Roger Weingarten, a resident of Devereux in Santa Barbara, California who was diagnosed schizophrenic at age 15 like his namesake, is not on the board.
Despite her father leaving the majority of his multibillion-dollar fortune to the Annenberg Foundation, it is estimated that Annenberg has a personal fortune in excess of five hundred million dollars.

Philanthropic projects include Wallis Annenberg PetSpace, Wallis Annenberg GenSpace, Wallis Annenberg Center for the Performing Arts, Annenberg Space for Photography, Annenberg Community Beach House and Wallis Annenberg Wildlife Crossing.

References

Wallis
American billionaires
Jewish American philanthropists
American socialites
People from Philadelphia
People from Beverly Hills, California
Philanthropists from California
Philanthropists from Pennsylvania
California Democrats
Pine Manor College alumni
1939 births
Living people
American people of German-Jewish descent